Élisabeth Duparc or Du Parc, nicknamed "La Francesina", (died 1778) was a French soprano notable for appearing in several premieres and performances of the oratorios and operas of Handel - she played the title role, for example, in the premiere of Semele, and sang in the premiere of Saul.

After training in Italy she sang in Florence (1731, 1734–35) then London (1736 onwards) - at the latter she initially joined the Opera of the Nobility, where she appeared in operas by Riccardo Broschi, Egidio Duni, Giovanni Battista Pescetti and Francesco Maria Veracini.

References

French operatic sopranos
1778 deaths
Year of birth unknown
Singers from London
Place of birth unknown